Elections were held to Newcastle City Council on 10 June 2004, coinciding with elections to the European Parliament. The entire complement of 78 seats in the City were contested due to major boundary changes that year. The Liberal Democrats ended thirty years of Labour control and the table below shows the composition of the council following the election.

2004
21st century in Newcastle upon Tyne
2004 English local elections